CyKey (pronounced "sai-ki" or "psyche") is a one-handed chorded keyboard, catering to both left- and right-handed users.  It features nine keys, grouped into three sets of three.

CyKey was introduced in 1996 by Bellaire Electronics. It was a follow-on to the Microwriter, meant to be used with personal computers and Palm PDAs. It was named after Cy Endfield, co-inventor of the Microwriter.

References

External links

Computer keyboard models
Computing input devices
Products introduced in 1996
Physical ergonomics